KMGQ (105.3 FM) was a radio station broadcasting an Oldies music format. Formerly licensed to Pine Bluffs, Wyoming, United States, the station was owned by Chisholm Trail Broadcasting LLC.

KMGQ's license was surrendered by its owners to the Federal Communications Commission (FCC) on March 31, 2014; the FCC cancelled the license on April 1, 2014.

References

External links

MGQ
Oldies radio stations in the United States
Radio stations established in 1950
Defunct radio stations in the United States
Radio stations disestablished in 2014
1950 establishments in Wyoming
2014 disestablishments in Wyoming
MGQ